Eva Bester is a French journalist.

Life 
Eva Bester was a student in English when she applied for an internship for the program "Chemins de la connaissance" on France Culture. She then worked for the program Concordance des temps.

In 2012 she was a columnist on television, on the show 28 minutes on Arte.
In 2013, she participated in the cultural program on France Inter Encore heureux, presented by Arthur Dreyfus.

She produced and hosted the show Remède à la mélancolie on France Inter, which aired on Sunday morning, starting in 2013. In 2016, the program has a million and a half listeners on average.

In October 2016, she published at Autrement a book entitled "Remedies to melancholy: movies, songs, books ... consolation through the arts".

References

External links 

Year of birth missing (living people)
Living people
French journalists